Oreopanax jelskii is a species of plant in the family Araliaceae. It is endemic to Peru, Bolivia and Ecuador.

References

Flora of Bolivia
Flora of Ecuador
Flora of Peru
jelskii
Vulnerable plants
Taxonomy articles created by Polbot